The R. T. Moore House near Bernice, Louisiana was built in about 1865.  It has also been known as Sweet Onion.  It was listed on the National Register of Historic Places in 1994.

It is a -story frame farmhouse.  It originally had a narrow dogtrot between two rooms with fireplaces.  A stairway was replaced in 1903 and an L-shaped kitchen wing was added in 1913.

References

Houses on the National Register of Historic Places in Louisiana
Houses completed in 1865
Union Parish, Louisiana